Microsoft Internet Explorer 5 (IE5) is the fifth, and by now, discontinued, version of the Internet Explorer graphical web browser, the successor to Internet Explorer 4 and one of the main participants of the first browser war. Its distribution methods and Windows integration were involved in the United States v. Microsoft Corp. case. Launched on March 18, 1999, it was the default browser in Windows 98 Second Edition, Windows 2000 and Windows ME (later default was Internet Explorer 6) and can replace previous versions of Internet Explorer on Windows 3.1x, Windows NT 3.51, Windows 95, Windows NT 4.0 and the original release of Windows 98. Although Internet Explorer 5 ran only on Windows, its siblings Internet Explorer for Mac 5 and Internet Explorer for UNIX 5 supported Mac OS X, Solaris and HP-UX.

IE5 presided over a large market share increase over Netscape Navigator between 1999 and 2001, and offered many advanced features for its day. In addition, it was compatible with the largest range of OSes of all the IE versions. However, support for many OSes quickly dropped off with later patches, and Windows XP and later Windows versions are not supported, because of inclusion of later IE versions. The 1999 review in PC World noted, "Credit the never-ending game of browser one-upsmanship that Netscape and Microsoft play. The new IE 5 trumps Netscape Communicator with smarter searching and accelerated browsing."

IE5 attained over 50% market share by early 2000, taking the lead over other browser versions including IE4 and Netscape. 5.x versions attained over 80% market share by the release of IE6 in August 2001. 5.0x and 5.5 were surpassed by Internet Explorer 6.0, dropping it to the second most popular browser, with market share dropping to 34 percent by mid-2003. In addition, Firefox 1.0 had overtaken it in market share by early 2005. Market share of IE5 fell below 1% by the end of 2006, right when Internet Explorer 7 was released.

Microsoft spent over US$100 million a year in the late 1990s, with over 1000 people working on IE by 1999 during the development of IE5.

The rendering behavior of Internet Explorer 5.x lives on in other browsers' quirks modes. Internet Explorer 5 is no longer available for download from Microsoft. However, archived versions of the software can be found on various websites.

It is the last version of Internet Explorer to support Windows 3.1x, Windows NT 3.51, Windows 95 and Windows NT 4.0 service packs 3—6; as the following version, Internet Explorer 6, only supports Windows NT 4.0 SP6a or later.

History

The actual release of Internet Explorer 5 happened in three stages. First, a Developer Preview was released in June 1998 (5.0B1), and then a Public Preview was released in November 1998 (5.0B2). Then in March 1999 the final release was released (5.0). In September it was released with Windows 98 Second Edition. Version 5.01, a bug fix version, was released in December 1999. Windows 2000 includes this version. Version 5.0 was the last one to be released for Windows 3.1x or Windows NT 3.x. Internet Explorer 5 Macintosh Edition had been released a few months earlier on March 27, 2000, and was the last version of Internet Explorer to be released on a non-Windows platform. Version 5.5 for Windows was released in June 2000, bundled with Windows ME and 128-bit encryption. It dropped support for several older Windows versions.

A 1999 review of IE5 by Paul Thurrott described IE5 in ways such as, "Think of IE 5.0 as IE 4.0 done right: All of the rough areas have been smoothed out..", "....comes optionally bundled with a full suite of Internet applications that many people are going to find irresistible.", "IE 5.0 is a world-class suite of Internet applications."

Microsoft ended all support for Internet Explorer 5.5, including security updates, on December 31, 2005. Microsoft continued to support Internet Explorer 5.01 on Windows 2000 SP4, according to its Support Lifecycle Policy; however, as with Windows 2000, this support was ended on July 13, 2010.

Overview

Version 5.0, launched on March 18, 1999, and subsequently included with Windows 98 Second Edition and bundled with Microsoft Office 2000, was a significant release that supported bi-directional text, ruby characters, XML, XSLT and the ability to save web pages in MHTML format. There was enhanced support for CSS Level 1 and 2, and a side bar for web searches was introduced, allowing quick jumps throughout results.

The first release of Windows 98 in 1998 had included IE4. However, Internet Explorer 5 incorrectly includes the padding and borders within a specified width or height; this results in a narrower or shorter rendering of a box. The bug was fixed in Internet Explorer 6 when running in standards-compliant mode.

With the release of Internet Explorer 5.0, Microsoft released the first version of XMLHttpRequest (XHR), giving birth to Ajax (even though the term "Ajax" was not coined until years later.) XMLHttpRequest is an API that can be used by JavaScript, and other Web browser scripting languages to transfer XML and other text data between a page's client side and server side, and was available since the introduction of Internet Explorer 5.0 and is accessible via JScript, VBScript and other scripting languages supported by IE browsers. Windows Script Host was also installed with IE5, although later on viruses and malware would attempt to use this ability as an exploit, which resulted pressure to disable it for security reasons. Smart Offline Favorites feature was added to the Active Desktop component introduced in IE4.

An "HTML Application" (HTA) is a Microsoft Windows application written with HTML and Dynamic HTML and introduced with IE5. Internet Explorer 5.0 also introduced favicon support and Windows Script Host, which provides scripting capabilities comparable to batch files, but with a greater range of supported features.

Version 5.5 followed in June 2000. First released to developers at the 2000 Professional Developers Conference in Orlando, Florida, then made available for download, version 5.5 focused on improved print preview capabilities, CSS and HTML standards support, and developer APIs; this version was bundled with Windows ME. Version 5.5 also includes support for 128-bit encryption. Although it is no longer available for download from Microsoft directly it can also be installed with MSN Explorer 6.0 as msnsetup_full.exe. The full version of MSN Explorer can be downloaded only if you use Windows 95, Windows NT 4.0, Windows 98, Windows 98 SE and Windows 2000 if Internet Explorer 5.5 has not yet been installed. The full version will work on also Windows ME and Windows XP but you will need to download it on Windows 2000 or earlier and transfer the setup file to the newer operating system. If you still want to download it on a newer operating system the only way is to use an outdated web browser such as Netscape 4.8.

Although newer browsers have been released, IE5 rendering mode continues to have an impact, as a 2008 Ars Technica article notes:
IE5.5 (and below) was decidedly nonstandard in its rendering behavior. Hundreds of millions of web pages were written to look "right" in IE5.5's broken rendering. The result was something of a quandary for Microsoft when it came to release IE6. They wanted to improve the standards conformance in IE6, but could not afford to break pages dependent on the older behavior.

The solution was the "doctype switch". The doctype switch allowed IE6 to support both the old IE5.5 behavior—"quirks mode"—and new, more standards-conforming behavior—"standards mode."

United States v. Microsoft Corp.

On April 3, 2000, Judge Jackson issued his findings of fact that Microsoft had abused its monopoly position by attempting to "dissuade Netscape from developing Navigator as a platform", that it "withheld crucial technical information", and attempted to reduce Navigator's usage share by "giving Internet Explorer away and rewarding firms that helped build its usage share" and "excluding Navigator from important distribution channels".

Jackson also released a remedy that suggested Microsoft should be broken up into two companies. This remedy was overturned on appeal, amidst charges that Jackson had revealed a bias against Microsoft in communication with reporters. The findings of fact that Microsoft had broken the law, however, were upheld. The Department of Justice announced on September 6, 2001 that it was no longer seeking to break up Microsoft and would instead seek a lesser antitrust penalty. Several months later the Department of Justice agreed on a settlement agreement with Microsoft.

Major features
IE5 introduced many new or improved features:

 Web Page, Complete
 Web Archive (MHTML) (only with Microsoft Outlook Express 5)
 Language Encoding (new options such as Install On Demand)
 History Explorer Bar (new search and sort options)
 Search Explorer Bar (new options for searching)
 Favorites (make available offline)
 AutoComplete Feature
 Windows Radio Bar Toolbar
 Ability to set a default HTML Editor
 Internet Explorer Repair Tool
 FTP Folders allows browsing of FTP and Web-Based Folders from Windows Explorer. (see Shell extension)
 Approved Sites (PICS not required for listed sites option)
 Hotmail Integration
 There was also a Microsoft Internet Explorer 5 Resource Kit
 Compatibility Option allowed Internet Explorer 4 to be run side by side with IE 5, although IE 5.5 would be the last version with this feature.
 XMLHTTPRequest support via ActiveX, making IE 5 the earliest AJAX-capable browser

Bundled software
IE5 for Windows came with Windows Media Player 6.0 (with new Real Audio codecs), NetMeeting 2.11, Chat 2.5 and FrontPage Express 2.0. Other optional installs included Offline Browsing Pack, Internet Explorer Core Web Fonts, and Visual Basic Scripting (VBScript) support. Internet Explorer versions 5.0 and 5.5 are no longer available from Microsoft.

System and hardware requirements

Adoption capability overview
IE 5.01 SP2 was the last version to support Windows 3.1x and Windows NT 3.51. Support for 3.1x and NT 3.51 was dropped after that, as well as support for HP-UX, Solaris, the classic Mac OS, and Mac OS X. Windows 2000 was the last to support IE 5.0 (with which it was released) well after support in other Windows systems was deprecated. IE 5.5 SP2 was the last version to support Windows 95 and Windows NT 4.0 versions below SP6a, but above SP2. In addition, users of Windows NT 4.0 SP6a, Windows 98, Windows 2000 and Windows ME could upgrade to IE 6.0 SP1. IE5 was not developed for 68k Macs, support for which had been dropped in Internet Explorer 4.5.

Windows software
 Windows 32-bit versions, including Windows 95, Windows 98, Windows NT 3.51, Windows NT 4.0, and Windows 2000
 Windows 16-bit versions, including Windows 3.1 and Windows for Workgroups 3.11
 Note: Although Windows NT version 3.51 is a 32-bit platform, it must run the 16-bit version of Internet Explorer.
 UNIX, including Sun Solaris 2.5.1, Sun Solaris 2.6, and Hewlett Packard HP-UX

PC hardware
 Internet Explorer 5.0 for 32-bit Windows Operating Systems
 Minimum Requirements: 486DX/66 MHz or higher, Windows 95/98, 12MB RAM, 56MB disk space.
 Download Size: 37 MB
 There was also a 380 KB active installer that only downloaded selected components
 Internet Explorer 5.0 for 16-bit Windows Operating Systems
 Minimum Requirements: 486DX or higher, Windows 3.1 or NT 3.5, 12 MB RAM for browser only installation (16 MB RAM if using the Java VM). 30 MB disk space to run setup.
 Download Size: 9.4 MB

Apple Macintosh
Internet Explorer 5 for Apple Macintosh requirements:

 PowerPC processor
 Mac OS version 7.6.1 or later
 8 MB RAM plus Virtual Memory
 12 MB hard disk space
 QuickTime 3.0 or later
 Open Transport 1.2 or later

Versions

Early versions of Mac OS X shipped with Internet Explorer for Mac v5.1 as the default web browser, only until Mac OS X 10.2, where the default web browser in Mac OS X Panther is Safari.

See also
 Browser timeline
 Comparison of web browsers
 History of the Internet

References

External links
 Internet Explorer Architecture
 Internet Explorer Community—The official Microsoft Internet Explorer Community
 Internet Explorer History

1999 software
Gopher clients
Internet Explorer
Discontinued internet suites
Macintosh web browsers
MacOS web browsers
POSIX web browsers
Windows 98
Windows components
Windows ME
Windows web browsers
Windows 2000